Vasai-Virar is an agglomeration of four previously governed municipal councils i.e. Vasai, Virar, Nala Sopara, and Navghar-Manikpur and a few villages on the west as well as the east of the congested city area. It lies in the Konkan division of Maharashtra, India.

The twin city of Vasai-Virar is a part of the Mumbai Metropolitan Region (MMR). According to the 2011 census, it is the 5th largest city in Maharashtra. Within a close proximity to Mumbai,
it is located in Palghar District, & lies north of Vasai Creek and south of the Vaitarna River. Vasai-Virar is bordered by Mira-Bhayandar and Thane on its south and southeast, Bhiwandi-Nizampur on its east and Palghar rural district on its north. 

Vasai-Virar has several train stations. On the western line it has Naigaon, Vasai Road, Nala Sopara, Virar, and Vaitarna train stations, where as on the central line it has Juchandra and Kaman road stations.

History 

Vasai-Virar, formerly Bassein or Vasai, is a city (municipal corporation) in western Maharashtra state, western India. It lies on the Arabian Sea coast north of Mumbai (Bombay). Vasai town was part of the territory of the Hindu Devagiri Yadavas until 1317, and it later became a seaport for the Gujarat Muslim kings. In 1526 the Portuguese established a fort (now in ruins) and trading station at Vasai, and the town became famous for its shipbuilding industry.

The Portuguese, with their naval power and their crusading valor, were unquestioned masters of the Indian Ocean. When the Portuguese arrived, Vasai was under the rule of Bahadur Shah, the Sultan of Gujarat.

On 23 December 1534, the Sultan of Gujarat, signed a treaty with the Portuguese and ceded Vasai with its dependencies of Salsette, Mombaim (Bombay), Parel, Vadala, Siao (Sion), Vorli (Worli) (Worli fort photo), Mazagao (Mazgao), Thane, Bandra, Mahim, Caranja (Uran).

Vasai-Virar 
In 2009, the town was joined administratively with neighboring Virar (north) and several dozen other surrounding communities to form the Vasai-Virar twin city, and it immediately became one of the most-populous urban areas in the state. The city has long been a large-scale fishing centre and a wholesale exporter of agricultural produce. Traditional industries include silk and cotton hand-loom weaving and salt manufacture. There has been a rise in construction and in technology-related activities (e.g., software development).

Climate 
Vasai-Virar has a tropical wet and dry climate (Köppen: Aw). This moderate climate consists of high rainfall days and very few days of extreme temperatures. 80% of total rainfall occurs between June and October. The driest days are in winter, while the wettest days occur in July. In recent times, the area has become more flood prone due to rapid urbanization. The flooding, at times, cuts off the area from surrounding regions. Flooding has also affected transport, agriculture and industrial activities in the past.

Demographics
The population of Vasai-Virar was 1,221,233 at the 2011 census, up from 693,350 in 2001, 365,480 in 1991, and 219,868 in 1981, there exists slums and villages as well as urban zones. The projected current population according to the Municipal Corporation is 19.85 Lakhs.

The population of Vasai-Virar city comprises many different religions. Among them, Hinduism is practiced by 943,165 people which makes up to 78.05% of the total population, which is below the national average of 80.5%. The table given below shows the total populations of different religions that are practiced along with their percentage.

Governance and politics
The Vasai–Virar urban town is governed by Vasai-Virar Municipal Corporation. The town was formed in 2009 when it was joined administratively with Virar and other surrounding communities. Vasai-Virar city has been separated from Greater Mumbai and Mira-Bhayandar City because of presence of Vasai Creek. VVCMC is declared as ”C” Class Municipal Corporation.

Civic administration

Vasai-Virar Municipal Corporation (VVMC) was formed on 3 July 2010. It is headed by a Municipal commissioner, Shri. Gangatharan D., an Indian Administrative Service officer. He wields the executive power. A quinquennial election is held to elect the governing body, who are responsible for overseeing that their constituencies have the basic civic infrastructure in place, and that there is no lacuna on the part of the authorities.

The position of mayor is a largely ceremonial post with limited duties but the office-holder heads the party with the largest vote. The current mayor of the city Shri. Narayan Mankar. The total number of electoral wards within the city jurisdiction is a 115.

Civic services 
Public Transport: The VVMT uses diesel powered buses for its operation. All buses with electronic display board are introduced in the fleet, which have destination with the route number flashing in Marathi as well as English on front of the buses. The VVMT bus routes are spread city-wide and also to neighboring cities. The VVMT operates inter-city services to three different areas beyond the municipal limits of Vasai-Virar city, i.e. into the limits of the Municipal Corporations of the cities of Mira-Bhayandar, Thane, and Mumbai.

Digital Services: The VVMC website provides information on grocery shops, ration shops, medical shops, and community kitchen lists. The website also includes list of eye and blood banks in the city. The website also holds minutes of general body meeting since 2015.

Water Supply: Laying of water pipeline in the Coastal Regulation Zone III area of Kaman river has been approved for the Surya dam water project. The Mumbai Metropolitan Region Development Authority is executing the 403 million litres daily project (MLD) that will bring an additional 54 MLD water supply to the Vasai-Virar region.

Citizen Engagement: A blog known as Vasai Virar Blog for local information is managed by few citizens and can be used by all. It provides information on various services provided in the city like ambulance service and their contact numbers, hospital location in the city and the nearest police station. In addition, information about schools and colleges in the area are also available.

Transport
The city is well connected to Mumbai by Western Railway and through Mumbai-Ahmedabad National Highway. The city is connected to Navi Mumbai, Thane, Bhiwandi, Kalyan and Panvel node of Navi Mumbai city by the Vasai-Diva Railway line. Vasai-Virar city has significant growth potential due to close proximity to city-proper Mumbai.

Railways

Vasai-Virar city is connected by the Western Railway and Central Railway. The major railway stations on the Western and Central Railway in Vasai–Virar city are:
 Virar railway station (Western Railway): All Local, MEMU, Shuttle, very few Express trains but all Passenger Trains halt or depart from here.
 Nala Sopara railway station (Western Railway): All Local & MEMU halt here.
 Vasai Road railway station (Western/Central Railway): Vasai Road Railway Station is a Junction. All Local, MEMU, Shuttle, Express trains but only which are coming from Bhiwandi side and all Passenger Trains halt or Depart from here.
 Naigaon railway station (Western Railway): All Local Trains halt here.
 Juchandra railway station (Central Railways): All MEMU local halt here.
 Kaman Road railway station (Central Railway): All MEMU local halt here.

Road

Vasai-Virar City Municipal Corporation started its own transport service on 3 October 2012 in association with Bhagirathi Transport Corporation Pvt Ltd, known as VVMT. It operates a large number of bus lines in the Vasai-Virar city. VVMT also plies its buses in Vasai-Virar villages. It also has operation outside city limits into neighbouring city of Mira-Bhayandar, Thane, and Mumbai. VVMT bus ply from Vasai to Thane & Vasai to Mulund.

Operations

The VVMT bus routes are spread town-wide and also to neighboring towns and cities. The VVMT operates inter-city services to three different areas beyond the municipal limits of Vasai-Virar Town, i.e. into the limits of the Municipal Corporations of Mira-Bhayandar, Thane, and Mumbai.

Vasai-Virar City
The local bus services of the city, which are operated by VVMC. The internal places of Vasai-Virar city which are far from the Virar, Nala Sopara, Vasai Road, Naigaon Railway Stations are connected by VVMT. The major concentration has always been Vasai-Virar city and with vast growing population in the city.

Vasai-Virar Villages
It is not official, but some faraway villages from the Virar, Nala Sopara, and Vasai are connected by VVMT buses. VVMT services are not so frequent in villages as in the city.

Mira-Bhayandar City
Services start from Virar, Nala Sopara and Vasai Road Railway Stations and passes by Bhayandar via Ghodbunder Road. The inter city connection between the Vasai-Virar city (which on the western railway side) and (which is on the central railway side).

Thane City
Thane City is connected to Vasai by the VVMT. From Vasai, it starts its services towards Thane. The inter city connection is between Vasai-Virar city (which is on the western railway side) and Thane City / Central Mumbai City (via Thane City) (which is on the central railway side).

Mumbai City
Brihanmumbai Electricity Supply and Transport (BEST)  is the largest public transport provider in the Mumbai City & suburbs. VVMT connects the last station in Mumbai's suburb Mulund to the Vasai-Virar. The inter-city connection is between Vasai-Virar Town on the western railway side and Central Mumbai City on the central railway side.

Sports

Vasai-Virar Mayor's Marathon

Vasai-Virar Mayor's Marathon is annual marathon race organized in Vasai-Virar area. It began in 2011 and in 2012 became a National Level running event, recognized by the AFI. The event sees participation in excess of 15,000 across various categories and offers prize money in excess of Rs 30 lakhs.

Swimming Pool 

VVMC has built an Olympic-size Swimming Pool in Vasai & Virar.

References

 
Metropolitan cities in India
Cities in Maharashtra